The Battle of Meskiana occurred in North Africa in 698 between the Umayyad forces of Hassan ibn al-Nu'man and Queen Dihya.

According to the historian Ibn Idhari after destroying Carthage, Hassan ibn al-Nu'man inquired about the most powerful chief in all of Africa. He was told that it was Queen Dihya whom all the Berbers obeyed and that if he defeated her he would succeed in submitting the entire Maghreb.

In 698, Hassan ibn al-Nu'man attempted to seize the Aurès but he was defeated by Dihya and forced to retreat to Libya. The Umayyad army suffered heavy losses and a number of Arab soldiers were captured. Following this victory Queen Dihya became the uncontested ruler of the entire Maghreb for around five years.

References

Battles involving the Umayyad Caliphate
690s in the Umayyad Caliphate
Muslim conquest of the Maghreb